Artsiom Zaitsau (born 13 May 1995) is a Belarusian male track cyclist, representing Belarus at international competitions. He competed at the 2016 UEC European Track Championships in the team sprint event.

References

1995 births
Living people
Belarusian male cyclists
Belarusian track cyclists
Place of birth missing (living people)
European Games competitors for Belarus
Cyclists at the 2019 European Games